Ray DiPalma (1943-2016) (born in New Kensington, PA in 1943) was an American poet and visual artist who published more than 40 collections of poetry, graphic work, and translations with various presses in the US and Europe. He was educated at Duquesne University (B.A., 1966) and University of Iowa (M.F.A., 1968).

Overview
DiPalma's were widely anthologized and published in numerous journals. Translations of his poems appeared in French, Portuguese, Italian, German, Spanish, and Chinese. His visual works (including artist's books, collages, and prints) were exhibited in numerous shows in the United States, Europe, Japan, and South America, and in a one-person show at the Stemplelplatt's Gallery in Amsterdam. Two videos based on his book January Zero were made in France.

At the time of his death, DiPalma lived in New York City and taught at the School of Visual Arts in Manhattan. During his life, his work was seen at Art Institute of Chicago; Special Collections, University of California, San Diego; J. Paul Getty Museum, Los Angeles; New York Public Library and the Museum of Modern Art.

Poetics
Often associated with the Language poets, DiPalma was the co-author of L E G E N D (1980) with Bruce Andrews, Charles Bernstein, Steve McCaffery, and Ron Silliman, which was the only book to actually appear under the L=A=N=G=U=A=G=E imprint.

His work was praised by such notable poets as Jackson MacLow and Robert Creeley. About his 1995 collection, Motion of the Cypher, critic Marjorie Perloff has written, "These chiseled lyric meditations recall Wallace Stevens in their density, but they are written under the sign of Dada - appropriate for the late twentieth century, that casts a cold eye on the margins, the spaces between, where we live."

Of DiPalma's work, Robert Creeley wrote:

Selected publications
Max (The Body Press, 1969)
Between the Shapes (Zeitgeist, 1970)
Soli (Ithaca House, 1974)
Observatory Gardens (Berkeley: Tuumba Press, 1979)
Planh (Casement, 1979)
January Zero (Coffee House Press, 1984)
The Jukebox of Memnon (Potes & Poets Press, 1988)
Raik (Roof Books, 1989)
Mock Fandango (Los Angeles: Sun & Moon Press, 1991)
Metropolitan Corridor (Zasterle, 1992)
Numbers and Tempers: Selected Early Poems  (Los Angeles: Sun & Moon Press, 1993)
Platinum Replica [with Elizabeth DiPalma] (Stele, 1994)
Hôtel des Ruines [with Alexandre Delay], (Royaumont, 1994)
Provocations (Potes & Poets, 1994)
Motion of the Cypher ( Roof Books, 1995)
Letters (Littoral Books, 1998)
Chartings, with Lyn Hejinian. (Chax Press, 2000)
45° (Stele, 2000)
The Ancient Use of Stone: Journals and Daybooks 1998-2008. (Otis Books / Seismicity Editions, 2009)

also of note: Le Tombeau de Reverdy (translated to French by Emmanuel Hocquard & Juliette Valéry) was published in Marseille by cip/M & Un bureau sur l'Atlantique.

External links
DiPalma at TheEastVillage.com
Ron Silliman on Ray DiPalma an appreciation
from The Ancient Use of Stone new poetry (2006) by DiPalma
Three poems at Jacket Magazine
Four poems at "Exquisite Corpse'
e-text of Legend
Ray DiPalma Papers. Yale Collection of American Literature, Beinecke Rare Book and Manuscript Library.

1943 births
American male poets
Language poets
2016 deaths
Duquesne University alumni
University of Iowa alumni
People from New Kensington, Pennsylvania